Baruq District is a former administrative district of Miandoab County, West Azerbaijan province, Iran. At the 2006 National Census, its population was 23,662 in 5,234 households. The following census in 2011 counted 23,014 people in 6,321 households. At the latest census in 2016, the district had 22,385 inhabitants in 6,723 households. After the census, the district was separated from Miandoab County, elevated to the status of Baruq County, and divided into two districts.

References 

Miandoab County

Districts of West Azerbaijan Province

Populated places in West Azerbaijan Province

Populated places in Miandoab County